Muhammad Imran Attari is a speaker of the international Islamic organisation Dawat-e-Islami. He was born in Karachi, Pakistan. Maulana Muhammad Imran Attari has been the head of the Central Executive Body of Dawat-e-Islami since 2005. He launched his leadership under the guidance of Ameer e Ahle Sunnat, Maulana Ilyas Qadri.

Religious preaching 
Imran Attari was invited to speak at religious events in U.K, Chechen Republic, Germany, and several other countries. Imran also addressed people in different universities. During the lectures, he highlighted the compassionate principles of Islam and how they prioritize the well-being of others.

Efforts for Islamic education 
Imran and his Dawat-e-Islami delegation met with high-level officials in Pakistan to discuss matters of religious and bilateral interest. Their talks included the need for accurate Holy Quran education in schools and jails. These meetings showcased the crucial role of religious scholars in Pakistani society.

In September 2015, he visited Darul Uloom Pretoria, expressing his appreciation for their work, giving advice, and inspiring students, later visiting another branch in Cape Town.

References

Living people
Pakistani Sunni Muslim scholars of Islam